Beas de Granada is a town located in the province of Granada, Andalusia, southern Spain. ,  the town had a population of 1050 inhabitants. The settlement is at a height of 1072 meters above sea level and therefore has good views of the sierra Nevada. It is within the Parque Natural de la Sierra de Huétor.

History
The town can be traced back to a crossroads during the time of the Romans and even under the Arabs it was only about 20 buildings.

Notable people
Alhambra Nievas the Rugby Union player and referee was born here.

References

Municipalities in the Province of Granada